In computational complexity theory, a PTAS reduction is an approximation-preserving reduction that is often used to perform reductions between solutions to optimization problems. It preserves the property that a problem has a polynomial time approximation scheme (PTAS) and is used to define completeness for certain classes of optimization problems such as APX. Notationally, if there is a PTAS reduction from a problem A to a problem B, we write .

With ordinary polynomial-time many-one reductions, if we can describe a reduction from a problem A to a problem B, then any polynomial-time solution for B can be composed with that reduction to obtain a polynomial-time solution for the problem A. Similarly, our goal in defining PTAS reductions is so that given a PTAS reduction from an optimization problem A to a problem B, a PTAS for B can be composed with the reduction to obtain a PTAS for the problem A.

Definition
Formally, we define a PTAS reduction from A to B using three polynomial-time computable functions, f, g, and α, with the following properties:

 f maps instances of problem A to instances of problem B.
 g takes an instance x of problem A, an approximate solution to the corresponding problem  in B, and an error parameter ε and produces an approximate solution to x.
 α maps error parameters for solutions to instances of problem A to error parameters for solutions to problem B.

Properties

From the definition it is straightforward to show that:
  and 
  and 

L-reductions imply PTAS reductions.  As a result, one may show the existence of a PTAS reduction via a L-reduction instead.

PTAS reductions are used to define completeness in APX, the class of optimization problems with constant-factor approximation algorithms.

See also 
 Approximation-preserving reduction
 L-reduction
 APX

References 

 Ingo Wegener. Complexity Theory: Exploring the Limits of Efficient Algorithms. . Chapter 8, pp. 110–111. Google Books preview

Reduction (complexity)
Approximation algorithms